PBK Nadezhda Orenburg is a Russian women's basketball club from Orenburg founded in 1994.

Nadezhda has been 3rd in the Russian Premier League in 2010 and 2011, and reached the Russian Cup's final from 2011–12, as well as from 2014-16, everytime losing to UMMC Ekaterinburg. In addition they have been regularly playing in FIBA Europe competitions since 2005, reaching the final of the 2010 Eurocup. Additionally, they played in the Euroleague since 2008, except in the 2009–10 season.

Winners
 EuroLeague:
 Runners-up: 2015–16
 FIBA Eurocup:
 Winners: 2018–19
 Runners-up: 2009–10
 FIBA Europe SuperCup Women
 Runners-up: 2019
 Russian Championships:
 Runners-up: 2013–14, 2014–15, 2015–16
 Third place: 2009–10, 2010–11, 2011–12, 2012–13, 2016–17, 2017–18, 2018–19, 2019–20
 Russian Cup:
 Winners: 2020–21
 Runners-up: 2010–11, 2011–12, 2013–14

Roster

Former players
  Kara Braxton
  Renee Montgomery
  Katie Douglas
  Zane Tamane
  Iva Perovanović

References

Women's basketball teams in Russia
Basketball teams established in 1994
Sport in Orenburg
EuroLeague Women clubs